Dr. Alexa Irene Canady  (born November 7, 1950) is a retired American medical doctor specializing in pediatric neurosurgery. She was born in Lansing, Michigan and earned both her bachelors and medical degree from the University of Michigan. After completing her residency at the University of Minnesota in 1981, she became the first black woman to become a neurosurgeon. This came after Ruth Kerr Jakoby became the first American woman to be board certified in neurosurgery in 1961.

Canady specialized in pediatric neurosurgery and was the chief of neurosurgery at the Children's Hospital in Michigan from 1987 until her partial retirement in 2001. In addition to surgery, she also conducted research and was a professor of neurosurgery at Wayne State University. After her retirement, she moved to Florida and maintained a part-time practice at Pensacola's Sacred Heart Hospital until her full retirement in January 2012. In 1989, Canady was inducted into the Michigan Women's Hall of Fame, and in 1993 she also received the American Medical Women's Association President's Award. Dr. Canady was known amongst her peers as a patient-focused surgeon who cared deeply about each of her patients.

Early life and education
Alexa Irene Canady was born in Lansing, Michigan to Elizabeth Hortense (Golden) Canady and Dr. Clinton Canady, Jr. Her mother was an educator and former national president of Delta Sigma Theta Sorority, Inc. She also spent years being active in civic affairs within the city of Lansing. In addition she was the first African American to be elected to the Lansing Board of Education. Her father was a dentist. Her parents attended Fisk University, where they met and later married on her mother's 19th birthday right before her father's deployment during World War II. Her father was also a graduate of Dentistry of Meharry Medical College. Canady's parents taught her about the importance of education and hard work as a child, which would ultimately help her graduate from high school with honors.

Canady and her younger brother were raised outside of Lansing and were the only two African-American students in their school. Her mother being a former President of Delta Sigma Theta and her father a dentist, she was taught the importance of education from an early age. Her mother once told her, "Let them make you the token — so what if you're the token black girl. Take that token and spend it." She faced prejudice in school; in one instance, a family member who was training in psychology tested her at a young age for intelligence, and when she scored highly on the exam, her family was surprised because her performance in school was only average. They later discovered that her teacher had been switching her test scores with a white student to cover up her intelligence.

She faced many obstacles throughout her school years. However, despite these obstacles, Canady stood out among her peers academically, both in the classroom and by earning high scores on her tests in school. She graduated with honors from Lansing Sexton High School in 1967.

Before university, Alexa Canady was nominated as a National Achievement Scholar in 1967. Canady attended the University of Michigan where she received her B.S. degree in zoology in 1971 and became a member of Delta Sigma Theta. Her time at the University of Michigan was not without its struggles; she almost dropped out of college at one point due to a "crisis of confidence". She had originally chosen to major in mathematics but she soon realized that math was not her passion. Then she learned of a minority health careers program at her university and decided to pursue it. This program helped her realize that her passion was in the medical field. She would then go on to receive her M.D. with cum laude honors from the University of Michigan Medical School in 1975 where she joined the Alpha Omega Alpha medical honor society. While in medical school she was also recognized by the American Medical Women's Association. Despite her achievements in  medical school, Canady felt as if she, and the other female students, were often overlooked by the professors. This only encouraged her to work harder. Although she initially had an interest in internal medicine, Dr. Canady decided on neurosurgery after falling in love with neurology during her first two years of medical school. She settled on this specialty against the recommendations of her advisors. Knowing that gaining a residency as a black student would be difficult, Canady began building her résumé, reading many articles and attending every conference and seminar she could, sometimes asking questions just to get known in the small field. Her appreciation for the fluidity of human anatomy would serve her well in her competitive field.

She then became a surgical intern at the Yale-New Haven Hospital from 1975–1976, rotating under Dr. William F. Collins. Although an exceptional student, she still faced prejudice and discriminatory comments as she was both the first black and female intern in the program. On her first day as an intern, she was told that "you must be our new equal-opportunity package". Despite these prejudices, she was voted one of the top residents by her fellow physicians.

After completing her internship, she went to the University of Minnesota for her residency, becoming the first female African-American neurosurgery resident in the United States. Although she has stated that she was not focused on the history she was making, after moving to Pensacola, Florida in 2001, she realized the significance of her accomplishments and what it meant for other African-Americans and women in medicine.

Career and research 
In 1982, after finishing residency, Dr. Canady decided to specialize as a pediatric neurosurgeon, becoming the first African-American and the first woman to do so. She chose pediatrics because of her love of the children in the pediatric ward during her residency stating “it never ceased to amaze me how happy the children were”. As a patient-focused surgeon, she was known to play videogames with her pediatric patients and form relationships with each patient.

She started practicing for a short time at the Henry Ford Hospital before going to work at the Children's Hospital of Michigan. She then became the first African-American woman to be a board-certified Neurosurgeon in 1984.  She became Chief of Neurosurgery at the Children's Hospital of Michigan in 1987 and held the position until her partial retirement in 2001. During her time as Chief, she specialized in congenital spinal abnormalities, hydrocephalus, trauma and brain tumors. She conducted research and published an article about the effectiveness of the treatment for hydrocephalus that were available in 2001. While initially she was worried about how she would be received by her peers, she quickly gained admiration for being a patient-care focused surgeon.  In a recent interview she stated, “It’s fun to make people better”.

During her years at the Children's Hospital of Michigan, Dr. Canady also continued research with Wayne State University. She served as a Professor of Neurosurgery there as well. Her work and accomplishments have opened the door for many surgeons of all races and genders.  From 2001 to her retirement in 2012, Dr. Canady worked as a part-time surgeon and consultant at Sacred Heart Hospital in Pensacola, Fl. After moving to Pensacola, Dr. Canady initially considered herself retired.  However, after meeting local doctors and realizing the need for a pediatric neurosurgeon in the area, Dr. Canady decided to join the staff at Sacred Heart Hospital, working part-time. In addition to her career as a surgeon, Dr. Canady continued to do research with Wayne State University. This research would eventually lead to the development of an antisiphon shunt that helps to treat hydrocephalus. In a recent interview on why she thinks students should choose neurosurgery she states, "It's intellectually challenging, you get kind of a high when everybody says 'ah, the neurosurgeon is here'". Dr. Canady continues to be both an advocate for her profession as well as diversity in medicine.

Awards and honors

Canady was inducted into the Michigan Women's Hall of Fame in 1989. Canady received the American Medical Women's Association President's Award in 1993 and in 1994 was awarded the Distinguished Service Award from Wayne State University Medical School. In 1984 she was named Teacher of the Year by Children's Hospital of Michigan. She received a Candace Award from the National Coalition of 100 Black Women in 1986. She is a member of the Congress of Neurological Surgeons, the American Association of Neurological Surgeons, the Society of Pediatric Neurosurgery, and the American College of Neurosurgery.

She has also been awarded three honorary degrees – doctor of humane letters honorary degrees from the University of Detroit-Mercy in 1997 and Roosevelt University in 2014, and a doctor of science from the University of Southern Connecticut in 1999.

Canady was also featured in a Nickelodeon Black History Month short animation that aired in February 2015 to celebrate her achievement of being the first African-American woman to become a neurosurgeon.

Canady has stated that she does not like getting attention or being famous. Rather she has said that "if you do good work, the rest doesn't matter".

References

External links
 African-American Registry biography
Nickelodeon Black History Month Animation
Faces of Title IX Biography

Living people
1950 births
American neurosurgeons
University of Michigan Medical School alumni
Delta Sigma Theta members
American women physicians
African-American physicians
People from Lansing, Michigan
African-American women physicians
Women surgeons
21st-century African-American people
21st-century African-American women
20th-century African-American people
20th-century African-American women